Raymundo Cárdenas Hernández (born 3 February 1950) is a Mexican left-wing politician from Zacatecas affiliated with the Party of the Democratic Revolution (PRD) who currently serves in the lower house of the Mexican Congress.

Early life
Cárdenas was born on 3 February 1950 in Villanueva, Zacatecas. He studied chemical engineering at the Autonomous University of Zacatecas, where he remained as a long-time professor.

Political career
Cárdenas joined the Mexican Communist Party (PCM) in the late 1970s, which merged into the Unified Socialist Party of Mexico (PSUM) in 1981. From 1983 to 1986 he served as local deputy in the Congress of Zacatecas representing the PSUM, then from 1991 to 1994 he served again in the Congress of Zacatecas during the LV Legislature representing the PRD.

In 2000 he was elected to serve in the Senate during the LVIII and LIX Legislatures (2000 to 2006).

In the 2006 Congressional Election he won a seat in the lower house of the Mexican Congress.

References

1950 births
Living people
20th-century Mexican politicians
21st-century Mexican politicians
Unified Socialist Party of Mexico politicians
Party of the Democratic Revolution politicians
Members of the Chamber of Deputies (Mexico)
Members of the Senate of the Republic (Mexico)
Members of the Congress of Zacatecas
People from Villanueva, Zacatecas
Politicians from Zacatecas
Autonomous University of Zacatecas alumni
Academic staff of the Autonomous University of Zacatecas